Golden League may refer to:
Golden League (California), a high-school athletic conference in Los Angeles County
Golden League (handball), a team handball competition for European national teams
Golden Baseball League
IAAF Golden League
, Estonian defunct annual series of outdoor track and field meetings

CEV Volleyball Golden European League, part of 2018 Men's European Volleyball League and 2018 Women's European Volleyball League
 Golden League (Judo): European Judo Club Championships